Mundy Pond is a pond in St. John's, Newfoundland and Labrador, Canada that runs along Mundy Pond Road. It has facilities such as a park and skatepark near its shore, with a trail around its shore.

Refererences

Lakes of Newfoundland and Labrador
Landforms of St. John's, Newfoundland and Labrador
Polders